Grigori Gorin, real name Grigori Israilevich Ofshtein (March 12, 1940, Moscow — June 15, 2000, Moscow)  was a Soviet and Russian playwright and writer of Jewish descent.

Gorin is particularly credited with scripts for several plays and films, which are regarded as important element of cultural reaction to the Era of Stagnation and perestroika in Soviet history.

Biography
Gorin was born in Moscow to a Jewish family of Soviet Army officer father and doctor mother. After graduation from the Sechenov 1st Moscow Medical Institute in 1963, Gorin worked as an ambulance doctor for some time (his mother spent her medical career on similar position).

He was involved in amateur playwriting from his student years. First, with the sketches for the students' local KVN network club. Gorin started publishing his satirical articles and sketches since 1960th, finally choosing writing as the professional career. He worked as a Chief of Humor Department in Yunost magazine, using Galka Galkina pen name.

In 1966, first book was published — Four Under One Cover (co-authored).

In 1978 — 1990 Gorin was a regular participant in the Vokrug Smekha (Around Laughter), the popular TV program.

Selected works

Dramaturgy
 Til, 1970 — loosely based on Till Eulenspiegel and other national folklore
 Forget Herostratus! —  tragic comedy, 1972
 The Very Truthful, 1974 —  about Baron Munchausen
 The House That Swift Built, 1980
 Phenomenons, 1984
 Good Bye, Compere!, 1985
 Domestic Cat of Average Downiness, 1989 —  co-authorship with Vladimir Voynovich
 Memorial prayer, 1989 theatrical, 1993 televised version - loosely based on a Sholem Aleichem work
 Kean IV, 1991 — loosely based on Edmund Kean's biography
 Plague on Both Your Houses!, 1994 — a loose sequel to Romeo and Juliet by William Shakespeare
 Royal Games, 1995
 Luckyman-Unluckyman (Schastlivtsev-Neschastlivtsev), 1997
 Balakirev The Buffoon, 1999 theatrical, 2002 televised version

Screenplays
 To Kill a Dragon, 1988
 My Tenderly Loved Detective, 1986 (post-modernist comedy based on the Adventures of Sherlock Holmes)
 Formula of Love, 1984
 The House That Swift Built, 1983
 Say a Word for the Poor Hussar, 1980
 Naked Kurentsov, 1980
 Case on a Factory No. 6, 1980
 That Very Munchausen, 1979
 Velvet Season, 1978
 100 Grammes for Bravery, 1976
 You to Me, Me to You, 1976
 Small Comedies of a Big House, 1975
 Stop Potapov!, 1974

Cultural impact
Many of Gorin's aphorisms became popular among the Soviet people, e. g. piano in the bushes, which means painstaking preparations for a would-be impromptu. This particular one appeared in a humoresque called Quite accidentally by Arkanov and Gorin, published in that 1966 book.

References

External links
 
  Grigori Gorin at Lib.ru

1940 births
2000 deaths
Russian dramatists and playwrights
Russian male dramatists and playwrights
Male screenwriters
Writers from Moscow
Jewish dramatists and playwrights
Russian Jews
Jewish Russian actors
Soviet dramatists and playwrights
Soviet male writers
20th-century Russian male writers
I.M. Sechenov First Moscow State Medical University alumni
20th-century Russian screenwriters
20th-century pseudonymous writers